The Tahitian Handball League is a European Handball competition held in Tahiti. Handball is a very popular sport in French Polynesia as the roots of the sport is European. The winner and runner up of this tournament qualifies for the Oceania Handball Champions Cup.

Champions

References
 Men's League results on AS Dragon webpage
 League results on AS Faa'a webpage
 Women's results on AS Dragon webpage

Handball competitions in Oceania
Handball
Papeete